The 2019 Camellia Bowl was a college football bowl game played on December 21, 2019, with kickoff at 5:30 p.m. EST (4:30 p.m. local CST) on ESPN. It was the 6th edition of the Camellia Bowl, and one of the 2019–20 bowl games concluding the 2019 FBS football season. For 2019, the Camellia Bowl did not have a corporate naming sponsor.

Teams
The bowl matched the FIU Panthers and the Arkansas State Red Wolves. This was the ninth meeting between the programs; entering the game, Arkansas State led the all-time series, 6–2 (officially 4–2, as two wins were vacated per NCAA sanctions). From 2005 to 2012, FIU and Arkansas State were both members of the Sun Belt Conference; their previous meetings spanned that era.

FIU Panthers

FIU finished their regular season with a 6–6 record (3–5 in conference). The Panthers tied with Middle Tennessee for fifth place in the East Division of Conference USA.

Arkansas State Red Wolves

Arkansas State finished their regular season with a 7–5 record (5–3 in conference). The Red Wolves finished in second place in the West Division of the Sun Belt. This was the program's second Camellia Bowl, making them the second team (after Appalachian State) to appear in multiple Camellia Bowls. The 2017 Red Wolves appeared in that season's Camellia Bowl, losing to Middle Tennessee, 35–30.

Game summary

Statistics

References

External links

Game statistics at statbroadcast.com
Game statistics at camelliabowl.com

Camellia Bowl
Camellia Bowl
Camellia Bowl
Camellia Bowl
Arkansas State Red Wolves football bowl games
FIU Panthers football bowl games